Samuel Wakefield Brown (May 21, 1878 – November 8, 1931) was a professional baseball player.  He was a catcher for two seasons (1906–07) with the Boston Beaneaters/Doves.  For his career, he compiled a .200 batting average with 34 runs batted in.

An alumnus of Grove City College, he was born in Webster, Pennsylvania and later died in Mount Pleasant, Pennsylvania at the age of 53.

External links

1878 births
1931 deaths
People from Westmoreland County, Pennsylvania
Boston Beaneaters players
Boston Doves players
Major League Baseball catchers
Baseball players from Pennsylvania
Birmingham Barons players
Toledo Mud Hens players
Columbus Senators players
Grove City College alumni
Toronto Maple Leafs (International League) players